Boris Yotov (born 25 February 1996) is an Azerbaijani rower of Bulgarian origin, a member of the Azerbaijani rowing silver medalist team of the 2014 European Championship and the Youth Olympic Games in 2014 in Nanjing. He was selected to represent Azerbaijan at the 2016 Summer Olympics in Rio de Janeiro.

References

External links
  worldrowing.com

Azerbaijani male rowers
Rowers at the 2014 Summer Youth Olympics
Place of birth missing (living people)
Rowers at the 2016 Summer Olympics
Olympic rowers of Azerbaijan
1996 births
Naturalized citizens of Azerbaijan
Living people
Azerbaijani people of Bulgarian descent